Howl most often refers to:

Howling, an animal vocalization in many canine species
Howl (poem), a 1956 poem by Allen Ginsberg

Howl may also refer to:

Film 
 The Howl, a 1970 Italian film
 Howl (2010 film), a 2010 American arthouse biopic film
 Howl (2015 film), a 2015 independent British horror film

Literature 
 Howl and Other Poems, the collection of poetry containing "Howl"
 Howl (magazine), published by the Hunt Saboteurs Association in Britain
 Wizard Howl, fictional character in the 1986 novel Howl's Moving Castle by Diana Wynne Jones

Music 
 Howl (Black Rebel Motorcycle Club album), 2005
 Howl (Rival Consoles album), 2015
 Howl (EP), a 2008 EP by American metal band Howl
 "Howl" (song), a song by Beware of Darkness
 Howl, a 2012 EP by Beware of Darkness
 "Howl", 2009 song by Florence and the Machine from the album Lungs
 "Howl", a track from The Gaslight Anthem's 2012 album, Handwritten
 "Howl", 2016 song by Biffy Clyro from the album Ellipsis
 "Howl", song by Blood Red Shoes from the album Get Tragic

Bands 
 Howl (Norwegian band), Norwegian rock band
 Howl (American band), American metal band
 Howl, former name of Australian punk band Hunting Grounds

See also 
 Howling (disambiguation)